Tacking is a legal concept arising under the common law relating to competing priorities between two or more security interests arising over the same asset.  The concept is best illustrated by way of example.
 Bank A lends a first advance to the borrower, which is secured by a mortgage over the borrower's property.  The mortgage is expressed to secure this advance and any future advances.
 Bank B subsequently lends more money to the borrower and takes a second ranking mortgage over the same property.
 Bank A then subsequently lends a second advance to the borrower, relying on its original mortgage.
Bank A will always have a first priority claim against the property for the full amount of its first advance. But it will be able to claim against the property in priority to Bank B with respect to its second advance only if it is permitted to tack the second advance to the mortgage that was taken at the time the first advance was made.  If Bank A is not permitted to tack the second advance, then Bank B's claim in respect of the sums that it lent will have priority over Bank A's claims with respect to the second advance.

In American jurisprudence, Black's Law Dictionary defines tacking in slightly narrower terms:

Separately, in the definition of tabula in naufragio, Black's comments:

The common law rules

The first case which approached the position in relation to competing mortgagees was Gordon v Graham. During the nineteenth century, its authority came to be doubted. It was questioned whether it had been correctly reported and, even if correctly reported, whether it correctly stated the law.

The matter subsequently came before the House of Lords in Hopkinson v Rolt. In the case, the borrower entered into a mortgage over his land which was expressed to "secure the sums due and which shall from time to time become due" to the bank.  Later, the borrower granted a second mortgage in favour of another creditor.  Notice of the second mortgage was given to the bank.  The borrower was later declared bankrupt, and a dispute arose as to the priority of the bank with respect to advances which were made under the first mortgage after it had received notice of the second mortgage.

The three law lords who heard the case were divided, with a majority favouring priority for the second mortgagee.  Lord Campbell, the Lord Chancellor (with whom Lord Chelmsford agreed), opined:

The dissenting judge, Lord Cranworth, was in favour of upholding the rule in Gordon v Graham as it was reported.  He expressed his view in a dissenting opinion:

Actual notice

Although for years it had been supposed that it was sufficient for the first mortgagee to have either actual or constructive notice of the second mortgage, in Westpac Banking Corporation v Adelaide Bank Limited it was held that constructive notice was not sufficient, and that a first mortgagee could tack future advances unless it had actual notice of the second ranking security.

Effect of subordination
Where a subordination agreement places a later mortgage in higher priority than one previously granted, the validity of releases granted by the previous mortgagors will have a significant impact on the priority assigned to each of the secured debts in question. In 2014, the Court of Appeal of Newfoundland and Labrador held in Medoc Properties Limited v. Standard Trust Company that the failure by an assignee to release one of two assigned mortgages with respect to such an agreement resulted in differing priorities given to them.

Term loans and overdrafts

The common law rules relating to tacking have caused difficulty in relation to overdrafts and revolving loan facilities because of the rule in Clayton's Case, which provided that in relation to any account, payments into the account are presumed to discharge the earliest debts first. This has been held to have several effects:

 Where notice of a second mortgage is given, subsequent payments into the account are applied to reduce the overdraft existing at the time of the notice and, in effect, for the benefit of the subsequent mortgagee.
 The subsequent mortgagee takes subject to the overdraft only at that time, that is to say, not subject to future advances, and the reduction of the overdraft correspondingly improves his security. If the overdraft is paid off, then any subsequent indebtedness will be by way of future advances and the bank mortgage will be postponed entirely in relation to the subsequent mortgage, although the bank mortgage does not cease to be effective between the bank and its customer, the mortgagor.

The rule is only a presumption of convenience, but in practice it is difficult to displace, and can have a devastating effect on the security rights of first mortgagees. For example, suppose a customer secures an overdraft with a mortgage against their house.  Then at a time when the overdraft stands at £100,000, the customer grants a second mortgage over their house as security for a term loan to another bank.  If over the following nine months, the customer was to pay £90,000 into the account and draw a further £70,000 out of the account, the amount owed to the first bank would be reduced to only £80,000, but they would only have first ranking security for a mere £10,000.  For the remaining £70,000 they would rank behind the second mortgagee.

Accordingly, in practice a bank will normally "break" an account when they receive notice of a subsequent charge over property which stands as security for an overdraft.

Statutory modification

Ultimately, Hopkinson was thought to cause more inconvenience than it solved, and a number of common law jurisdictions have sought to modify the position by statute.

Modification in England and Wales

The Parliament of the United Kingdom has modified the application of the common law rules in several respects:

 With respect to unregistered land, s. 94 of the Law of Property Act 1925 enables further advances to be tacked onto a first mortgage if:
 (a) the intervening mortgagee consents,
 (b) the bank had no notice of the intervening mortgage at the time of the advance, or
 (c) the original mortgage actually obliged the bank to make further advances.

 With respect to registered land, s. 49 of the Land Registration Act 2002 provides that a bank may tack if:
 (a) the intervening mortgagee consents,
 (b) the bank had no notice of the intervening mortgage from the subsequent mortgagee, or
 (c) the original mortgage actually obliged the bank to make further advances and this agreement had been entered in the register prior to the creation of the subsequent charge.

Notes

Footnotes

External links
 , which contains a discussion on the law of tacking

Property law